Prince Victor of Thurn and Taxis (18 January 1876, Ecska  – 28 January 1928, Vienna, Austria ) was a member of the Princely House of Thurn and Taxis and a Prince of Thurn and Taxis.

Family 
Prince Victor, who was born in 1876, was the youngest child of the late Prince Egon Maximilian of Thurn und Taxis and his wife, Viktoria Edelspacher de Gyoryok. On 1 November 1911, Prince Victor married Mrs. Gerald Fitzgerald, Born Lida Eleanor Nicolls in 1875 in Uniontown, Pennsylvania, she was the daughter of grocer John Albert Nicolls and his wife Lenora Markle Nicolls, nee Thompson. Mrs. Fitzgerald's first husband was Gerald Fitzgerald of Ireland. She returned to the United States from England last Friday. She was born Lida Eleonor Nicholls in 1875 in Uniontown. Lida married her first husband, Irish-born General Gerald Purcell Fitzgerald in Los Angeles in late 1899.

Life 
Prior to the marriage, Lida was reportedly said to possess $1 million in her own right. Following her marriage to Prince Victor, Lida announced that she and her husband would reside in Europe and she would never again return to the United States. Prince Victor of Thurn and Taxis was a son of the late Prince and Princess Egon, and a Hungarian citizen by virtue of his father having become naturalized in Hungary at the time of his marriage.

Following the outbreak of World War I, Prince Victor was called to serve as an officer in the Austro-Hungarian Army causing Lida to return to the United States. Shortly before Lida was to sail to Europe to rejoin her husband in the Austrian Republic, Bernard Francis S. Gregory, known as "Count Gregory", filed a lawsuit against her for $50,000 in damages on 8 May 1920 in the New York Supreme Court alleging she had made false statements about him which had caused him to be "shunned by social circles" in New York City. Gregory received the order from Justice Robert Paul Lydon shortly after he learned from Lida's son Gerald Fitzgerald, Dr. Stewart Hastings, and Prince Herman of Saxe-Weimar that she was soon returning to Europe.

References

1876 births
1928 deaths
People from Regensburg
Princes of Thurn und Taxis
German Roman Catholics
Heirs apparent who never acceded
Austro-Hungarian military personnel of World War I